Sankalp is a 1975 Bollywood film directed by Ramesh Saigal. The song "Tu Hi Sagar Tu Hi Kinara", rendered by Sulakshana Pandit earned her its only Filmfare award. It was composed by Khayyam.

Plot 

Rakesh lives with his widowed businessman dad Harkishanlal; elder brother Shyam, his wife, Kamla and their son. He attends college, does extremely well in his exams, and stands first with only one other candidate, who comes from a poor family. Rakesh also has a sweetheart in fellow-collegian, Geeta Sehgal, and both hope to get married soon. Rakesh introduces Geeta to Kamla, and gets instant approval. But there is something troubling Rakesh, he is appalled at the inequalities and injustices in this world, the power the rich have over the poor; why God remains a silent spectator in the light of atrocities, committed on his very own creations. Rakesh sets out to seek answers within his family, and is shunned. His dad and brother want him to lend a hand in their business, but Rakesh does not want any part in it as part of it is being run by black money, surrounded by hypocrites. He stops seeing Geeta, and when Kamla finds this out, she follows him one day and finds him with a group of half-naked, drug-induced hippies. When confronted, Rakesh's only explanation is that he will not marry Geeta as he does not want to get tied down and wants his freedom – what exactly is the freedom that Rakesh seeks – watch as he runs away from home to seek life's meanings along with newfound hippie friends.

Cast 

Sulakshana Pandit as Poojaran
Sukhdev as Rakesh
Farida Jalal as Geeta Sehgal
 Arjun Bakshi as Shyam
 Bipin Gupta as Harkishanlal (Shyam's dad)
Anjali Kadam as Kamla (Shyam's wife)
 Leela Mishra as Rani of Bacharawa (Kamla's mom)

Soundtrack 

Music composed by Khayyam and lyrics
by Kaifi Azmi.

Awards and nominations

 Filmfare Award for Best Female Playback Singer – Sulakshana Pandit for the song "Tu Hi Sagar Tu Hi Kinara"

1974 films
1970s Hindi-language films
Films directed by Ramesh Saigal